Tim Henman was the defending champion but did not compete that year.

Lars Burgsmüller won in the final 6–3, 6–3 against Olivier Rochus.

Seeds
A champion seed is indicated in bold text while text in italics indicates the round in which that seed was eliminated.

  Jiří Novák (quarterfinals)
  Rainer Schüttler (quarterfinals)
  Nicolas Kiefer (first round)
  Davide Sanguinetti (semifinals)
  Mikhail Youzhny (first round)
  Jarkko Nieminen (first round)
  Adrian Voinea (first round)
  Christophe Rochus (quarterfinals)

Draw

External links
 2002 Copenhagen Open draw

2002 Copenhagen Open – 1
2002 ATP Tour